Tovuz District is one of the 66 districts of Azerbaijan. It is located in the north-west of the country and belongs to the Gazakh-Tovuz Economic Region. The district borders the districts of Gadabay, Shamkir, Samukh, Agstafa, as well as the Tavush Province of Armenia and Kakheti region of Georgia. Its capital and largest city is Tovuz. As of 2020, the district had a population of 177,200. A major train line runs through the center, stopping at Tovuz Station.

In July 2020, Tovuz became the main site for the clashes with Armenia.

Geography 
Tovuz covers 412 km2. The rayon is mountainous in the south, where it is crossed by the Lesser Caucasus mountains.

The region includes rich deposits of ores and precious metals, notably gold.

The region is located in the north-west of the Republic, bordering Georgia to the north, Armenia to the west, Gadabay to the south and south-west, Shamkir to the east, Samukh from north-east to the north.

The southern part of the district is located in the lowlands, the northern part lies in low mountainous and foothill zone, where positive and negative relief forms are shifted. There are three climate areas in the district:

 Dry subtropical climate. Characterized by soft summers and hot springs.
 Mild hot dry climate. This is a climate up to place less than 1000 meters high. The winter is mild and the spring is warmer.
 Mild cold, forest climate. This climatic hill covers the area from 1,000 to 2,000 meters. The spring is cool, and the winter is a bit frosty.

The river network:

 the Kur River in the north
 the Tovuz River in the central part 
 the Akhunca River, 
 the Asrik River, 
 the Zayam River in the eastern part and its small arms,

The Kur River divides the region into two parts. The left coast is used as the main pasture for cattle breeding. The right bank of the river is used for agriculture, occupies the forest fund of the region and the meadow grassland. The annual rainfall is 40–70 mm.

Villages 
There about 20 main villages in the district. They are Quşçu, Öysüzlü, Ayıblı, Alakol, Yuxarı Öysüzlü, Abulbəyli, Düz Qırıqlı, Düz Cırdaxan, Yanıqlı, Qəribli, Azaplı, Bozalqanlı, Dönük Qırıqlı, İbrahimhacılı, Dondar Quşçu, Kirən, Əlibəyli villages and Qovlar settlement. Qovlar settlement is more populated area among them.

Population 
According to the statistics urbanization is low in the district. 26968 people live in the city and 130907 people live in the village. According to census of 2019, Tovuz has over 175.5 thousand people, out of which 1531 are war veterans.

Over 25536 are students and currently are in process of education.

According to census of 2012 quantity of people from different nations were divided in this way:

Cultural centers 

In Tovuz district, there are 4 museums, 13 cultural centers, 6 libraries and a Photo Gallery.Mədəniyyət - TOVUZ RAYON Icra Hakimiyyəti. Museums include Heydar Aliyev Center, History and Local Lore Museum, Ozan Ashug Museum and State Symbols Museum.

Economy 
The region is dominated by agriculture. Wine, fruit, vegetables and grain crops are all produced along with cattle.

Stock raising is one of the main revenue source of this region:

There are 24 entities which operate in industrial and agricultural sphere:

Where the sown areas for agricultural plants are:

2020 Tovuz clashes 
According to Azerbaijani MOD, in the afternoon of July 12, Armenian Armed Forces started to fire on Azerbaijani State Border Service positions in Tovuz region using artillery mounds. Thus, clashes between the Armenian Armed Forces and Azerbaijani Armed Forces broke out on July 12.The skirmishes resumed on 13 July and are ongoing with varying intensity, having resulted in at least 16 military and one civilian casualties. Among Azerbaijani military casualties were one major general (Polad Hashimov), one colonel (Ilgar Mirzayev) and two majors (Anar Novruzov and Namig Ahmadov). However, the fighting has decreased, the situation in the region is still considered as volatile.

Notable natives 

 Ganira Pashayeva, Member (MP) of the National Assembly of Azerbaijan for Tovuz District and journalist

Gallery

References

External links 
Tovuz, the land of antiquity and natural beauty. washingtontimes.com
 

 
Districts of Azerbaijan